The IAAF World Road Relay Championships was a biennial international athletics competition in long-distance relay running. First organised by the International Association of Athletics Federations (IAAF) in 1992, the championship ran for four editions, with its last one occurring in 1998.

The relay format was based on the ekiden races native to Japan, where six runners team up for legs of varying length to cover the classic 42.195 km marathon distance. The first, third and fifth legs were of 5 km each, the second and fourth legs were 10 km each, and the final leg covered the remaining 7.195 km.

The first edition saw the Kenyan men's team break the world record for the ekiden relay with a run of 2:00:02 hours. The Moroccan team at the following edition improved this further with a world and championship record time of 1:57:56 hours. The Ethiopian women's team set the championship record of 2:16:04 hours in 1996 and retained their title the following year. Kenya and Ethiopia were the most successful nations at the event – Kenya took three men's titles, as well as a women's silver and a men's bronze, while Ethiopia had two women's titles, three silver medals and one bronze medal.

The competition was preceded by the IAAF World Challenge Road Relay – a one-off race held in 1986 in Hiroshima.

Editions

Medallists

Men

Women

Medal table
NB: Excludes World Challenge Road Relay medals

References

List of medallists
IAAF World Road Relay Championships. Association of Road Racing Statisticians (2004-03-27). Retrieved on 2013-09-30.

External links
1998 official website
Past Championships

 
Road Relay
Defunct athletics competitions
Road Relay Championships
Long-distance relay races
Recurring sporting events established in 1992
Recurring events disestablished in 1998
Biennial athletics competitions